Tarinkot Airport is located about  of driving distance south from the center of Tarinkot in Afghanistan, next to the Tarinkot-Kandahar Highway. It is a domestic airport under the country's Ministry of Transport and Civil Aviation (MoTCA), and serves the population of Uruzgan Province. Security in and around the airport is provided by the Afghan National Security Forces.

The airport has a single story passenger terminal and a separate 4-story tall control tower. The adjacent Ministry of Defence's air base has several heliports, aircraft parking areas, and various buildings used by the Afghan Armed Forces for regular military and periodic emergency relief purposes.

Other nearby major airports to Tarinkot are Nili Airport in neighboring Daykundi Province to the north, Qalat Airport in Zabul Province to the southeast, Ahmad Shah Baba International Airport in Kandahar to the south, Bost Airport in Lashkar Gah to the southwest, and Farah Airport in Farah to the west.

History

Tarinkot Airport was expanded in the last two decades, mainly by NATO's International Security Assistance Force (ISAF). The current Afghan military base, which is next to the civilian section of the airport, was recognized by ISAF as Multi National Base Tarin Kot.

Airlines and destinations

On 29 June 2009, Kam Air started flying between Kabul and Tarinkot three times a week. The service was financially supported by the Dutch government as a way to contribute to the development of Afghanistan. The flights were conducted with a Boeing 737 before suspended.

See also
List of airports in Afghanistan

References

External links

 
 

Airports in Afghanistan
Urozgan Province